The slogan Nur für Deutsche (English: "Only for Germans") was a German ethnocentric slogan indicating that certain establishments, transportation and other facilities such as park benches, bars and restaurants were reserved exclusively for Germans. It was used during the World War II in many German-occupied countries, especially Poland from 1939 onwards. Signs bearing the slogan were posted at entrances to parks, cafes, cinemas, theaters and other facilities. They were normally the best such facilities to show the indigenous population the alleged "superiority" of the Germans.

History

In German-occupied Poland, racial segregation was nearly complete by 1940.  In streetcars and trains, the first car was usually reserved for German administrative and military personnel, Nazi party members, and German civilians.  Other nationalities were to use the remaining cars.  Jews were refused any such usage.  The segregation was repeated in other occupied countries such as parts of the Soviet Union for example.  It was another way to intimidate local people, in addition to  imposition of legal constraints, curfews and unfair exchange rates. Jews were discriminated against in all occupied countries as well as Germany itself, and some towns boasted of their judenfrei status.  The constraints on Jews were the most severe of all, and they were refused ownership of cars, bicycles, radios and could only go shopping at limited times for example.  They were forbidden to use park benches and then public parks at all, notices included "Juden verboten" were commonplace across Germany.  Such restrictions were applied gradually in Germany from 1933 on, but much more rapidly following invasion of a country. Thus Austrian Jews suffered extreme restraints faster after the Anschluss in 1938, as did Poland from 1939 onwards after military conquest.  The German attitude was based on its racial philosophy of being the "master race", to whom all other "races" were inferior, and thus to be exploited and enslaved.

Similar signage was used in South Africa during apartheid and in the United States during Jim Crow, where bus travel for example was racially segregated.  Discriminating signage was also used informally in the UK, notably in signs in bed and breakfast accommodation barring Irish and blacks. Such signs are now illegal.

Reaction
In Polish partisan parlance, toxic or otherwise undrinkable moonshine was jocularly called "nur für Deutsche".
Partisans were also fond of painting the words "nur für Deutsche" on graveyard fences or street lampposts (a reference to hanging).

See also
 No Irish, No Blacks, No Dogs
 Apartheid
 Dogs and Indians not allowed
 Ghetto benches
 History of Poland (1939–1945)
 Judenfrei
 Nazi eugenics
 Nazi Glossary
 No dogs and Chinese allowed
 Operation Ostra Brama
 Racial segregation
 Separate but equal

References

External links
 

German words and phrases
Poland in World War II
Nazi eugenics
Nazi terminology
Germany–Poland relations
Segregation
1930s neologisms
Political quotes
Slogans